The 1845 Florida gubernatorial election was held on May 26, 1845 to elect the first Governor of Florida. Democratic nominee William Dunn Moseley defeated Whig nominee Richard Keith Call with 55.14% of the vote.

General election

Candidates
William D. Moseley, Democratic
Richard K. Call, Whig

Results

Results by County

See also

 1845 United States House of Representatives election in Florida

References

1845
Florida
Gubernatorial